Nikica Klinčarski (Macedonian: Никица Клинчарски; born 5 January 1957) is a Macedonian retired footballer.

Club career
He played a total of 518 matches for FK Partizan being by this the second player with most games played in the club, behind Momčilo Vukotić with 752. He played in the Major Indoor Soccer League in the United States under the name of Nicky Klincarski.

International career
He played a total of eight matches for Yugoslavia national football team. His debut was crowned with a goal on 22 March 1980 in Sarajevo against Uruguay (2-1 win) and his last match was on 30 March 1983 in Timişoara against Romania (2–0 win).

Notes

References

External links
 
 MISL stats

1957 births
Living people
People from Berovo
Association football wingers
Macedonian footballers
Yugoslav footballers
Yugoslavia international footballers
Olympic footballers of Yugoslavia
Footballers at the 1980 Summer Olympics
FK Partizan players
Las Vegas Americans players
Pittsburgh Spirit players
Chicago Sting (MISL) players
Västra Frölunda IF players
FK TSC Bačka Topola players
Yugoslav First League players
Major Indoor Soccer League (1978–1992) players
Allsvenskan players
Yugoslav expatriate footballers
Expatriate soccer players in the United States
Yugoslav expatriate sportspeople in the United States
Expatriate footballers in Sweden
Yugoslav expatriate sportspeople in Sweden
FK Partizan non-playing staff